The Chapel of Saint Dominic Soriano is a Roman Catholic church building in Villa Soriano, Soriano Department, Uruguay.

History
Santo Domingo Soriano was one of the oldest European settlements in the colonial Banda Oriental, dating to 1624. At that time it had a very humble chapel. The present building was constructed much later, but nevertheless constitutes a historic landmark. It features the only articulated image of Jesus Christ in Uruguay.

This chapel is annexed to the Parish of Dolores.

References

External links

Roman Catholic church buildings in Soriano Department